Elections in the Republic of India in 2002 included elections to seven state legislative assemblies and the elections for the posts of President and vice-president.

Legislative Assembly elections

Goa

Gujarat

Jammu & Kashmir

Manipur

Punjab

|- align=center
!style="background-color:#E9E9E9" class="unsortable"|
!style="background-color:#E9E9E9" align=center|Political Party
!style="background-color:#E9E9E9" |No. of Candidates
!style="background-color:#E9E9E9" |Seats won
!style="background-color:#E9E9E9" |Number of Votes
!style="background-color:#E9E9E9" |% of Votes
|-
| 
|align="left"|Indian National Congress||105||62||3,682,877||35.81%
|-
| 
|align="left"|Shiromani Akali Dal||92||41||3,196,924||31.08%
|-
| 
|align="left"|Bharatiya Janata Party||23||3||583,214||5.67%
|-
| 
|align="left"|Communist Party of India||11||2||220,785||2.15%
|-
| 
|align="left"|Independents||274||9||1,159,552||11.27%
|-
|
|align="left"|Total||923||117|| 10,284,686||
|-
|}

Uttar Pradesh

Uttarakhand

Presidential election 

An election was held on 15 July 2002 to elect the President of India. On 18 July 2002, the results were declared. A. P. J. Abdul Kalam became the 11th President by beating his nearest rival Lakshmi Sahgal.

Vice-Presidential election 

An election was held on 12 August 2002 to elect the newly vacated post of Vice-President of India. Bhairon Singh Shekhawat defeated Sushil Kumar Shinde to become 11th Vice President of India. Incumbent VP Krishan Kant did not contest the election and died before the election occurred.

|- align=center
!style="background-color:#E9E9E9" class="unsortable"|
!style="background-color:#E9E9E9" align=center|Candidate
!style="background-color:#E9E9E9" |Party
!style="background-color:#E9E9E9" |Electoral Votes
!style="background-color:#E9E9E9" |% of Votes
|-
| 
|align="left"|Bhairon Singh Shekhawat||align="left"|BJP||454||59.82
|-
| 
|align="left"|Sushil Kumar Shinde||align="left"|INC||305||40.18
|-
| colspan="5" style="background:#e9e9e9;"|
|-
! colspan="3" style="text-align:left;"| Total
! style="text-align:right;"|759
! style="text-align:right;"|100.00
|-
| colspan="5" style="background:#e9e9e9;"| 
|-
|-
|colspan="3" style="text-align:left;"|Valid Votes||759||99.09
|-
|colspan="3" style="text-align:left;"|Invalid Votes||7||0.91
|-
|colspan="3" style="text-align:left;"|Turnout||766||96.96
|-
|colspan="3" style="text-align:left;"|Abstentions||24||3.04
|-
|colspan="3" style="text-align:left;"|Electors||790|| style="background:#e9e9e9;"|
|-
|}

References

2002 elections in India
India
2002 in India
Elections in India by year